The Royal Montserrat Police Service is the police service of the British Overseas Territory island of Montserrat in the Caribbean. The current Commissioner is Steve Foster, JP, BSc, CPA., a native and career police officer of Montserrat.

History
The Police Force of Montserrat was a division of the Leeward Islands Police Force, which served Antigua, St Kitts and Nevis, Anguilla, Montserrat and the British Virgin Islands, with headquarters in Antigua. The Leeward Islands Colony was dissolved in 1959 and the Montserrat Police Force became a division of the Antigua, Montserrat, and British Virgin Islands Police Force. The Royal Title was bestowed on the force in 1966, and The Royal Montserrat Police Service became autonomous on 27 February 1967.

Between the years 1967 and 2007, there was one Chief of Police and ten Commissioners of Police from countries such as United Kingdom, Guyana, St Kitts-Nevis and even native islanders.

The police service also ran a football team that played in the Montserrat Championship, the top level of football on the island. They were the most successful club winning the league four times.

The RMPS celebrated its 50th anniversary in February 2017, having been disbanded from the Leeward Islands Police Force in 1967.

Structure and Duties
The RMPS is a civilian, local police force and has authority to uphold the King's peace throughout the territory. The RMPS website states that their duty is:
Preservation of the King's Peace,
Protection of Life & Property,
Prevention and Detection of Crime and
Bringing Offenders to Justice.

Departments/Units
The RMPS is divided into five main departments, each with a specific function.

These are:
Beat & Patrol
Traffic Department
Marine & Immigration Department
Human Resource/Training/IT Department
Criminal Investigation Department (CID)/Criminal Records Office

Rank structure
The management rank structure of the RMPS follows that of most UK and British Overseas Territories.

The Commissioner (head of the service) is assisted by a Deputy Commissioner of Police and Superintendent of Operations.

Regular Ranks

Commissioner of Police (COP)
Deputy Commissioner of Police (DCP)
Superintendent (Operations) (Sup Ops) 
Inspector (OIC Departments)
Sergeant (SPO)
Constable (PC)

New "Recognition Ranks"

Chief Inspector
Station Sergeant
Corporal
Senior Constable

New "Marine Unit Ranks"

Marine Sergeant (MS)
Petty Officer (PO)
Leading Seaman (LS)
Able Body Seaman (ABS)
Ordinary Seaman (OS)

Special Constables
The RMPS employs special constables to assist regular constables, or to act as specialists and support regulars on 'Special Duty Police Assignments', if necessary.

Uniforms and Equipment
The RMPS employs a variety of staff & constables and each have different types of uniform and equipment, to perform their duties effectively.

Uniform
RMPS uniform is typical of British & Caribbean police forces' uniforms, with several different types for different duties, ranks and seasons. It is modelled on other UK and British Overseas Territories police uniforms.

Formal Uniform
The formal uniform is for ceremonial and important occasions, such as Remembrance Days, VE Day celebrations, Royal events, etc.

It consists of:

"Blues"
This is similar to the British Army's No. 2/service dress uniform.

Dark blue tunic, open at collar with white shirt & dark tie underneath
Dark blue trousers/skirt
Sam Browne belt
Dark blue peaked cap (males) or bowler cap (females), the RMPS logo forms the capbadge and a certain amount of braid on the cap is added for ranks from Inspector above.
Black shoes/boots
Dark gloves.

"Whites"
This uniform is similar to the British Army's No. 3 (Tropical) Dress, which is the most formal.

White tunic with silver buttons, worn open with white shirt and tie (females) and worn closed with high collar for males
Black trousers (males) or skirt (females) with white piping
Black belt with central clasp (lower ranks) or shoulder belt (senior officers)
White pith helmet (males), white-topped bowler cap (females) with capbadge
Black boots
White gloves.

Notes
Swords or swagger sticks (Inspectors and above) may be carried on certain occasions.
Medals (if any awarded) are worn on the left breast, above the breast pocket and medal ribbons are sewn into the tunic.
Rank insignia for Inspectors and above are worn on the shoulders/epaulettes. Sergeants wear three chevrons on the upper arm and constables wear no rank insignia.
Constables and Sergeants were a "Collar Number", on some part of the uniform.
The staple British police whistle-on-chain is worn on the chest/left pocket area of most uniforms.

"Undress" Uniform
The undress uniform is the uniform that is worn by police officers for non-formal and non-arduous work, such as everyday work, travelling, patrolling, attending meetings etc. It is similar to the British Army's No. 6 (Warm Weather) Barrack Dress and is 'stone' coloured.

It consists of:

Stone coloured bush jacket with silver buttons
Stone coloured trousers
Peaked cap (males) and female peaked cap (females) with RMPS capbadge
Black boots/shoes.

Notes
Constables wear their "Collar Number" on the right breast of the shirt.
Rank insignia for Inspectors and above are worn on the shoulders/epaulettes. Sergeants wear three chevrons on the upper arm and constables wear no rank insignia.
Lanyards may be worn by senior officers on the left side.
Medal ribbons (if any) are worn on the left breast.
The staple British police whistle-on-chain is worn on the chest/left pocket area of most uniforms.

Operational Uniform
The operational uniform for officers is either the "Undress" uniform (see above) (with additional equipment, e.g. yellow traffic vest) or a similar uniform, but with a white shirt and black trousers, rather than stone coloured shirt/trousers.

Police Equipment
The RMPS uses a variety of equipment, such as radios, handcuffs and yellow traffic vests.
The staple British police whistle-on-chain is worn on the chest/left pocket area of most uniforms.

Firearms
The RMPS are generally unarmed, but for some formal parades some weapons are carried, such as:

Sword (ceremonial sabre) – carried by senior officers (Inspectors in above), in either "Blues" or "Whites" formal uniform. It can be worn in it sheath, or 'drawn' when inspecting constables.
Rifle – either a No. 4 Lee Enfield Rifle or a more modern rifle. This is for the constables to carry on parade.
Drill cane/pace stick – this is for Sergeants to carry when on parade, when not carrying rifles.
Swagger stick (shorter cane) – this is for Inspectors and above to carry, when not carrying swords.

References

External links 
Official site
Review of Royal Montserrat Police Service May 2012

Government of Montserrat
Montserrat
Organisations based in Montserrat
Government agencies established in 1967